Eremorhax is a genus of Eremobatid camel spiders, first described by Carl Friedrich Roewer in 1934.

Species 
, the World Solifugae Catalog accepts the following ten species:

 Eremorhax arenus (Brookhart and Muma, 1987) — US (California)
 Eremorhax joshui (Brookhart and Muma, 1987) — US (California)
 Eremorhax latus Muma, 1951 — US (Arizona)
 Eremorhax magnellus (Brookhart and Muma, 1987) — US (Arizona, New Mexico)
 Eremorhax magnus (Hancock, 1888) — Mexico, US (New Mexico, Texas)
 Eremorhax mumai Brookhart, 1972 — US (Colorado, New Mexico)
 Eremorhax pimanus (Brookhart and Muma, 1987) — US (Arizona)
 Eremorhax puebloensis Brookhart, 1965 — US (Arizona, Colorado, New Mexico, Texas)
 Eremorhax pulcher Muma, 1963 — US (Arizona, Nevada)
 Eremorhax tuttlei (Brookhart and Muma, 1987) — US (Arizona)

References 

Arachnid genera
Solifugae